Tops Records was a Los Angeles-based record label owned by Tops Music Enterprises, both founded in 1947 by Carl L. Doshay and Sam Dickerman.  After a prolific and profitable run, Tops merged with PRI Records in 1958, which in turn, sold to a group of investors in 1960, then went bankrupt in about 1962.  Its assets — which included a huge library of recordings — were sold to Pickwick Records, a label that had been its main competitor throughout the 1950s. Pickwick's assets were purchased by PolyGram Records in the late 1970s.

Selected staff 
 Carl L. Doshay (1917–2010), founder and president
 Sam Dickerman (1915–2000), founder and vice president
 Corky Carpenter (pseudonym of Amos Randolph Carpenter; 1922–1986), A&R
 Harold Spina, A&R
 Dave Pell, producer

References

External links
 Tops Records on the Internet Archive's Great 78 Project

1947 establishments in California
Blues record labels
Defunct record labels of the United States
Record labels established in 1947
Record labels disestablished in 1962